The Taklimakan or Taklamakan Desert  (Xiao'erjing: , ; ; also spelled Teklimakan) is a desert in Southwestern Xinjiang in Northwest China. It is bounded by the Kunlun Mountains to the south, the Pamir Mountains to the west, the Tian Shan range to the north, and the Gobi Desert to the east.

Etymology

While most researchers agree on  being the Persian word for "place", etymology of Takla is less clear. The word may be a Uyghur borrowing of the Persian , "to leave alone/out/behind, relinquish, abandon" + makan. Another plausible explanation suggests it is derived from Turki taqlar makan, describing "the place of ruins". Chinese scholars Wang Guowei and Huang Wenbi linked the name to the Tocharians, a historical people of the Tarim Basin, making the meaning of "Taklamakan" similar to "Tocharistan". According to Uyghur scholar Turdi Mettursun Kara, the name Taklamakan comes from the expression Terk-i Mekan. The name is first mentioned as Terk-i Makan (ترك مكان / trk mkan) in the book called Tevarih-i Muskiyun, which was written in 1867 in the Hotan Prefecture of Xinjiang.

In folk etymology, it is said to mean "Place of No Return" or "get in and you'll never get out".

Geography

It is crossed at its northern and at its southern edge by two branches of the Silk Road, by which travellers sought to avoid the arid wasteland.
It is the world's second-largest shifting sand desert, with about 85% made up of shifting sand dunes, ranking 17th in size in a ranking of the world's largest deserts.
The few breaks in this sea of sand are small patches of alluvial clay. Generally, the steeper sides of the dunes face away from the prevailing winds.

The People's Republic of China has constructed two cross-desert highways. The Tarim Desert Highway links the cities of Hotan (on the southern edge) and Luntai (on the northern edge) and the Bayingol to Ruoqiang road crosses the desert to the east.

In recent years, the desert has expanded in some areas, its sands enveloping farms and villages as a result of desertification.

The Golmud-Korla Railway crosses the Taklamakan as well.

Named areas in the desert include Ha-la-ma, A-lang-ha and Mai-k'o-tsa-k'o. The Mazartag mountains are located in the western part of the desert.

Climate

Because it lies in the rain shadow of the Himalayas, Taklamakan has a cold desert climate.

Its extreme inland position, virtually in the very heartland of Asia and thousands of kilometres from any open body of water, accounts for the somewhat wide diurnal temperature variation.

Oasis

The Taklamakan Desert has very little water making it hazardous to cross. Merchant caravans on the Silk Road would stop for relief at the thriving oasis towns. It was in close proximity to many of the ancient civilizations—to the Northwest is the Amu Darya basin, to the southwest the Afghanistan mountain passes lead to Iran and India, to the east is China, and even to the north ancient towns such as Almaty can be found.

The key oasis towns, watered by rainfall from the mountains, were Kashgar, Miran, Niya, Yarkand, and Khotan (Hetian) to the south, Kuqa and Turpan in the north, and Loulan and Dunhuang in the east. Now, many, such as Miran and Gaochang, are ruined cities in sparsely inhabited areas in the Xinjiang Autonomous Region of the People's Republic of China.

The archaeological treasures found in its sand-buried ruins point to Tocharian, early Hellenistic, Indian, and Buddhist influences. Its treasures and dangers have been vividly described by Aurel Stein, Sven Hedin, Albert von Le Coq, and Paul Pelliot.
Mummies, some 4000 years old, have been found in the region.

Later, the Taklamakan was inhabited by Turkic peoples. Starting with the Han dynasty, the Chinese sporadically extended their control to the oasis cities of the Taklamakan Desert to control the important silk route trade across Central Asia. Periods of Chinese rule were interspersed with rule by Turkic, Mongol and Tibetan peoples. The present population consists largely of Turkic Uyghur people and ethnic Han people.

Scientific exploration
This desert was explored by several scholars, including Xuanzang, a 7th-century Buddhist monk, and, in the 20th century, the archaeologist Aurel Stein.

Atmospheric studies have shown that dust originating from the Taklamakan is blown over the Pacific, where it contributes to cloud formation over the Western United States. Further, the traveling dust redistributes minerals from the Taklamakan to the western U.S.A. via rainfall. Studies have shown that a specific class of mineral found in the dust, known as K-feldspar, triggers ice formation particularly well. K-feldspar is particularly susceptible to corrosion by acidic atmospheric pollution, such as nitrates and phosphates; exposure to these constituents reduces the ability of the dust to trigger water droplet formation.

In popular culture

The desert is the main setting for Chinese film series Painted Skin and Painted Skin: The Resurrection. The Chinese TV series Candle in the Tomb is mostly spent in this desert as they are searching for the ancient city of Jinjue (see Niya (Tarim Basin)).

The issue No. 39 'Soft Places' of Neil Gaiman's The Sandman takes place in the desert, when Marco Polo gets lost in the desert.

A portion of the Korean quasi-historical TV drama series Queen Seondeok takes place in the Taklamakan Desert. Sohwa escapes from Silla with baby Deokman and raises her in the desert. As a teenager, Deokman returns to Silla and uses the knowledge and experience gained from life among international traders in the Taklamakan trading centers to gain the throne of Silla.

The desert is showcased in the Japanese animation Mobile Suit Gundam 00, set in the year 2307. On the series, the Taklamakan Desert is the setting of a large-scale military joint operation performed by all the world's blocks of power, and interdicted by the paramilitary organization Celestial Being.

The Japanese anime Code Geass depicts a fictionalized version of Taklamakan Desert within the Chinese Federation, one of three superstates in the series. It serves as the setting of a key battle between the Holy Britannian Empire and Japanese insurrectionists backed by the Chinese Federation. Later, the presence of an underground city is revealed, where members of the Geass Order are being used by Emperor Charles zi Britannia and his consort Marianne vi Britannia to bring about the Ragnarök Connection.

Following the directions given to the fictional Karamakan desert in The Secret Commonwealth novel by Philip Pullman, one would end up in the western part of the Taklamakan Desert.

See also

Taklamakania, named for the desert

References

Citations

Sources 
 Jarring, Gunnar (1997). "The toponym Takla-makan", Turkic Languages, Vol. 1, pp. 227–240.
 Hopkirk, Peter (1980). Foreign Devils on the Silk Road: The Search for the Lost Cities and Treasures of Chinese Central Asia. Amherst: The University of Massachusetts Press. .
 Hopkirk, Peter (1994). The Great Game: The Struggle for Empire in Central Asia. .
 Tamm, Eric Enno (2010). The Horse That Leaps Through Clouds. Vancouver/Toronto/Berkeley: Douglas & McIntyre.  (cloth);  (ebook).
 Warner, Thomas T. (2004). Desert Meteorology. Cambridge University Press, 612 pages. .

Further reading

Videography
 Treasure seekers : China's frozen desert, National Geographic Society (2001)

External links

 Photos of area in China

Deserts of China
Deserts and xeric shrublands
Ecoregions of China
Ergs
Geography of Xinjiang
 
Sites along the Silk Road
Physiographic provinces
Ecoregions of Asia
Palearctic ecoregions
World Heritage Tentative List